Jahan Gulam Nuristani (born 1925) is an Afghan former field hockey player, who competed at the 1948 Summer Olympic Games and the 1956 Summer Olympic Games. He played in five matches and scored 2 goals.

References

External links
 

Field hockey players at the 1948 Summer Olympics
Field hockey players at the 1956 Summer Olympics
Olympic field hockey players of Afghanistan
Afghan male field hockey players
1925 births
Possibly living people